Bestla is a jötunn in Norse mythology, and the mother of the gods Odin, Vili and Vé (by way of Borr). She is also the sister of an unnamed man who assisted Odin, and the daughter (or granddaughter depending on the source) of the jötunn Bölþorn. Odin is frequently called "Bestla's son" in both skaldic verses and the Poetic Edda.

Bestla is attested in the Poetic Edda, compiled in the 13th century from earlier traditional sources, the Prose Edda, written in the 13th century by Snorri Sturluson, and in the poetry of skalds. Scholars have commented on the obscurity of the figure's name and have proposed various theories to explain the role and origin of the giantess.

Name
The meaning of the Old Norse name Bestla remains uncertain. Scholars have proposed potential meanings such as 'wife', or 'bark, bast'. It might stem from *Bastilōn (perhaps a yew goddess, originally a 'bast-donor'), or from *Banstillōn (via an intermediate form *Böstla), related to Old Frisian bös ('marriage, union', originally 'wife').

According to Rudolf Simek, "the name appears to be very old" due to its obscurity.

Attestations
In Gylfaginning (The Beguiling of Gylfi), she is portrayed as the daughter of the giant Bölþorn and as the spouse of Borr, while the enthroned figure of Hárr (High) tells Gangleri (described as king Gylfi in disguise) of the genealogy of the god Odin.

In Skáldskaparmál (The Language of Poetry), a poem by the skald Einarr Helgarson refers to Odin as "Bestla's son".

Hávamál (140) makes Bölþor(n) the grandfather of Bestla. Odin recounts his gaining of nine magical songs from Bestla's unnamed brother. If nothing indicates a family relationship between Odin and the man in the stanza (although skalds were certainly aware of Bestla as Odin's mother), and if the mead was allegedly stolen according to other sources, it is possible that Odin obtained magical songs from his maternal uncle.

Theories
On the basis of the Hávamál stanza handled above (wherein Odin learns nine magic songs from the unnamed brother of Bestla), some scholars have theorized that Bestla's brother may in fact be the wise being Mímir, from whose severed head the god Odin gains wisdom.

Since Odin is descended from the jötnar on his mother's side, the slaying of Ymir by him and his brothers could be seen as an intra-familial killing and, according to scholar John Lindow, "the slaying or denial of a maternal relation".

Waltraud Hunke has argued that Bestla should be regarded as the bark of the world tree on which Odin was perhaps born, alluding to Hávamál (141): "then I started to grow fruitful".

In his translation of the Poetic Edda, Henry Adams Bellows comments that such the position of the stanza 140 in Hávamál appears to be the result of manuscript interpolation, and that its meaning is obscure.

Notes

References

 Bellows, Henry Adams (1923). The Poetic Edda. American-Scandinavian Foundation.

Gýgjar